Patricia Kane (born Patricia M Howse in 1929) is a British actress who has appeared in a range of television roles from the 1950s through to the 2010s.
Kane is also known for her work in theatre productions, as well as her charity work, alongside her husband Howell Evans.

Selected filmography
Open All Hours (1985)
The Bill (three appearances in 1985, 1997 and 2002)
The Vicar of Dibley (1994)
Neverwhere (1996)
My Family (2003)
Doctors (2004)
Little Britain (2004)
Stella (2016)
Bryn (2020)

Personal life
She married actor Howell Evans. They had one son, born in 1953. Evans died in 2014.

References

External links

Living people
British television actresses
Actresses from Cardiff
1929 births